John Proctor may refer to:
John Proctor (artist) (1836–1914), Scottish cartoonist and illustrator
John Proctor (Salem witch trials) (1632–1692), hanged after being falsely accused and convicted for witchcraft
John Proctor (historian) (1521–1558), English schoolmaster
John Proctor (inventor) (1804–1822), American inventor
John Proctor (FBI agent) (1926–1999), American FBI agent
John Proctor (MP) (1520?–1558/59), English politician
John Proctor (bobsleigh) (born 1950), American bobsledder
John E. Proctor (1844–1944), American politician in the state of Florida
Jack Proctor (1871–1893), English footballer
John Clagett Proctor (1867–1956), American local historian, newspaper columnist, and printer

See also
 John Procter (disambiguation)
 
 Proctor John, fictional character in Fear the Walking Dead
 Proctor (surname)